Oued Morra is a town and commune in Laghouat Province, Algeria. According to the 1998 census it has a population of 4,748.

References

Communes of Laghouat Province